James Smillie, (born 28 November 1944), also credited variously as James Smillie; Jim Smillie and Jim Smilie, is a Scottish-born Australian actor. He has worked in both Britain and Australia in film, extensively on stage, on television, with voice-over and animation work. 

Smillie was born in Glasgow, Scotland and emigrated to Australia before returning to the United Kingdom to appear in stage roles in London's West End. On television, he's best remembered for the roles of Steve Wilson in Prisoner Cell Block H and Doctor Dan Marshall in the 1980s Australian mini-series and one full series of Return to Eden.

Career

Television and film
Smillie has appeared in films and television shows as featured actor and host, and as leading man on stage in the UK and Australia. His television credits include Return to Eden, Prisoner: Cell Block H, Adventure Island, Space: 1999 the episode End of Eternity, Thriller, The Gentle Touch, Skin Deep, Comedy Playhouse, The Mackinnons, Red Dwarf and Highlander: The Series. He has also made numerous appearances in a variety of light entertainment shows, including Highway with Sir Harry Secombe, An Evening with Barry Humphries, the BBC series Battle of the Sexes, and A Tribute to Robbie Burns for Scottish television. Crackerjack, and hosted his own series I Like Music. Smillie also has a Royal Variety Performances to his credit. He was also the original voice of Sky, voicing programmes there for over a decade.

International Theatre
On the London stage, he played Tony in West Side Story . The following years saw him playing leading men in a string of West End productions, notably: an Italian Lothario in Brian Clemens' whodunit Lover (Ambassadors Theatre); Henry II in Thomas and The King (Her Majesty's Theatre) music written by John Williams; Dr. Thomas Barnardo in Barnardo (Royalty Theatre); Nicos in Zorba; Georges in La Cage aux Folles (London Palladium); and also as Fred Graham in 'Kiss Me Kate' (RSC Savoy),  George Bernard Shaw's Candida as the Reverend James Mavor Morrell.

His other stage credits include Orin in Eugene O'Neill's Mourning Becomes Electra, Chance Williams in Tennessee Williams' Sweet Bird of Youth, Eilif in Mother Courage and Her Children, the lead in Tom Jones, Emile de Beque in South Pacific, and as Captain von Trapp in The Sound of Music. Followed by his success as Mack Sennet in the 1996 London production of Mack & Mabel, Smilie recorded the part of Fred/Petruchio again in the full live production of 'Kiss Me Kate' for the BBC in London with the BBC Concert Orchestra.

1998/99 and 2000 saw Smillie touring in the UK Productions tour of 42nd Street, playing the lead role of producer Julian Marsh. In 2001, he returned to Australia to play Pastor Manders in Henrik Ibsen's Ghosts for the Perth International Arts Festival. In 2003, he returned to the UK to play Charles in Stephen Sondheim's Putting It Together at the Library Theatre in Manchester. This was followed in 2004 by Daddy Warbucks in a touring production of Annie with Su Pollard and Caesar in a Sadlers Wells Lost Musicals production of Harold Rome, Joshua Logan and S. N. Behrman's Fanny.

Further films and local theatre productions
In film, Smillie has had small roles in International Velvet and Jaguar Lives!. In 2005, he appeared in two German-made films – Dark Ride and Rich Girl, Poor Girl. Smillie is also a regular radio and concert broadcaster for the BBC, particularly on the series Friday Night is Music Night, presenting special occasions such as Sondheim on the South Bank, An Evening with Cole Porter at the Royal Festival Hall, and as Pilate in Jesus Christ Superstar at the Barbican Centre. He is also a voice-over artist working in animation and on commercials, dubbing, audiovisuals, documentaries, and talking books. 

In 2005, Smillie returned to Australia for 7 years for personal reasons to care for his ageing mother and took a break from the business. On his return to the UK he settled back in Glasgow, and has since appeared stage productions at the Traverse Theatre, Oran Mor and the Pitlochry Festival Theatre. Most recently he has been more involved in film; La Correspondenza, directed by Giuseppe Tornatore, Tommy's Honour, director Jason Connery, Romans, directed by The Shammasian Brothers and Boyz in The Wood, director Ninian Doff.

Selected stage roles

Selected screen and television

References

External links
 

1944 births
Living people
Australian male film actors
Australian male musical theatre actors
Australian male soap opera actors
Australian male voice actors
Male actors from Glasgow
Scottish male film actors
Scottish male musical theatre actors
Scottish male soap opera actors
Scottish male television actors
Scottish male voice actors
People educated at Mount Lawley Senior High School
20th-century Australian male actors
20th-century Scottish male actors
21st-century Australian male actors
21st-century Scottish male actors